Félix Charpentier (10 January 1858 in Bollène in Vaucluse – 1924) was a French sculptor. His work was part of the sculpture event in the art competition at the 1924 Summer Olympics.

Biography
Félix Charpentier's father worked in a brick making factory and in 1871, Félix started work in the same factory.  He was to show artistic talent when very young and at the age of 7 he was modelling small figures from wood and from the clay which he found at the brickworks where his father was working. At 16 years of age he went to Avignon and enrolled at the École des Beaux-Arts there and became a pupil of the sculptor Armand.  In 1877, he entered the École nationale des beaux-arts de Paris and worked in the studio of Pierre-Jules Cavelier and Amédée Doublemard.  From 1878 onwards, Felix' reputation grew and in 1867 he won the silver medal at the Exposition Universelle and received several commissions.  He exhibited each year at the Salon des Artistes Français.  In 1882 the Salon awarded him a citation for the composition entitled "Le Repos du Moissonneur" and in 1884 he was awarded the 3rd Prize medal for the composition entitled  "Le Jeune Faune" which was then purchased by the city of Paris.

In 1887 his submission of the work in plaster entitled the "L'Improvisateur" won him the 2nd Prize medal and a paid visit to Italy and in 1889 with a bronze version of the same piece he won a silver medal at the Paris World Fair. In 1890 he won the Salon's 1st Prize medal and the Exhibition Prize for the compositions of "La Chanson" in marble and "Lutteurs" in plaster.  The marble version of "Les Lutteurs" was to subsequently bring him the Salon's highest award, the "Medal of Honour". It was purchased by the State and since 1905 has stood by the town hall of Bollène.  On 5 May 1892, the day of the unveiling of the monument celebrating Avignon's absorption into France, he was decorated with the title of Chevalier of the Légion d'honneur.  In 1888 he had married his model, Léa Lucas and they had a daughter called Francine. In 1900 he was elected mayor of Chassant in Eure-et-Loir where he lived.  During his life he received commissions for a number of public monuments and after the Great War he was chosen as the sculptor of various war memorials (monuments aux morts).

Principal works

War Memorials

After the end of the 1914–1918 war there was a huge demand for sculptors to work on war memorials (monument aux morts) There was a tendency for commissions for war memorial sculpture to be given to sculptors who had been born in the location involved or at least lived there. For this reason Charpentier was the preferred sculptor for the war memorials of Bollène, Roquemaure, Sainte-Cécile-les-Vignes and Saint-Paul-Trois-Châteaux, all in the region of his birth, whilst his adopted region commissioned him to carry out the sculptural work on the war memorials of Béville-le-Comte, Bonneval, Brou, Chassant, Combres, Dangeau, Frétigny, Fruncé and Unverre.  He was also asked to work on the war memorials of Misy-sur-Yonne and Genas. He also worked on a number of busts of prominent people and various medallions. Notes on some of the war memorials involving work by Charpentier are shown below,

War memorials gallery

Reproductions in bronze

A good number of Charpentier's works have been reproduced in limited editions, these in varying sizes. Many are in bronze and others in "Biscuit de Sèvres"

Gallery

Notes

References

External links
 

1858 births
1924 deaths
People from Vaucluse
19th-century French sculptors
French male sculptors
20th-century French sculptors
20th-century French male artists
Olympic competitors in art competitions
19th-century French male artists